Afroscoparia contemptalis is a moth in the family Crambidae. It was described by Francis Walker in 1866. It is found in South Africa, where it is found in the south-western part of the Western Cape Province.

The length of the forewings is 6.5-8.5 mm for males and 7.5–8 mm for females.

References

Endemic moths of South Africa
Moths described in 1866
Scopariinae